Lopburi (officially Lop Buri) may refer to

Lopburi town
Lopburi Province
Mueang Lopburi district
Lopburi River